Intigam Zairov (born 21 April 1985 in Baku) is an Azerbaijani weightlifter he won silver medal at 2009 European Weightlifting Championships in Bucharest.

He competed for Azerbaijan at the 2008 and 2012 Summer Olympics.

In 2016, he was disqualified from the Beijing 2008 Olympics following reanalysis of his samples from the 2008 Olympics, resulted in a positive test for the prohibited substance turinabol.

On 12 January 2017 it was announced that because of a doping violation he had been disqualified from the 2012 Olympic Games.

References

External links
 

Azerbaijani male weightlifters
Weightlifters at the 2012 Summer Olympics
Olympic weightlifters of Azerbaijan
1985 births
Living people
Weightlifters at the 2008 Summer Olympics
Azerbaijani sportspeople in doping cases
Doping cases in weightlifting
European Weightlifting Championships medalists
Islamic Solidarity Games medalists in weightlifting
20th-century Azerbaijani people
21st-century Azerbaijani people